John W. Wright was the head coach of The College of William & Mary's football team in 1894. He coached only one season and compiled a 0–1 record.

Head coaching record

References

Date of birth unknown
Date of death unknown
William & Mary Tribe football coaches